Nora Reiche (born 16 September 1983) is a German handballer playing for Thüringer HC and the German national team. She won the Champions League with Viborg in 2009.

Reiche made her debut on the German team in 2004. She received a bronze medal at the 2007 World Championship.

Achievements
Bundesliga:
Winner: 2006, 2011
German Cup:
Winner: 2006, 2007, 2011
Damehåndboldligaen:
Winner: 2008, 2009, 2010
Danish Cup:
Winner: 2007, 2008
EHF Champions League:
Winner: 2009, 2010
World Championship:
Bronze Medalist: 2007

References

External links
 Profile in Thüringer HC official website

1983 births
Living people
Sportspeople from Leipzig
German female handball players
Expatriate handball players
German expatriate sportspeople in Denmark